Explorer One, Explorer I, Explorer 1, or variation, may refer to:

 Explorer 1 (1958), U.S. Army research satellite, the first successful U.S. satellite
 Explorer I (1934), high altitude balloon from National Geographic and the U.S. Army; an unsuccessful attempt at the manned altitude record
 Raven Explorer I, a U.S. autogyro kitplane
 Explorer 1 (an Iranian rocket, a variant of the Safir (rocket)
 Viga Tech Explorer I, a Chinese UAV drone
 Foday Explorer I, a Chinese SUV

See also
 Explorer-1 Prime, a Montana State University cubesat
 Explorer-1 Prime Unit 2, a Montana State University cubesat
 Ocean Explorer I, the final name of the 
 , predecessor to the Lake Explorer II survey ship
 Rolex Explorer, predecessor to the Rolex Explorer II wristwatch
 Explorer (disambiguation)